Ophiocanops fugiens is a living species in the brittle star family Ophiocanopidae. Though once considered to be the only one living species in this brittle star family, recent research has brought to light three specimens of Ophiocanops that differ substantially from O. fugiens.  It has been regarded as the most primitive brittle star, close to Paleozoic forms, though other authors have disagreed with the view. Classification of O. fugiens is highly argued.  Ophiocanops is usually placed in the order Oegophiurida (suborder Zeugophiurina) or regarded as a genus incertae sedis or even given its own subclass Oegophiuridea. Some recent data suggest its relationship to the extant family Ophiomyxidae (it would thus belong to the order Phrynophiurida).

Characteristics
Ophiocanops fugiens displays a central, armored, disk-shape body that is clearly demarcated from the arms and is 3mm in diameter. Brittle Stars, including O. fugiens, have long flexible arms that they use to propel themselves through the water by moving them in a snake-like manner- hence the other common name for Brittle Stars- "Snake Stars". The arms reach lengths of 35-40mm, and are roughly 1mm across. The incredibly mobile arms are supported by an internal skeleton composed of calcium carbonate plates. These plates resemble vertebrae, and are appropriately named vertebral ossicles, in which these are controlled by O. fugiens muscular system. O. fugiens displays calcium carbonate plates on the body and arms, presumably for defensive measures, and the arms bear delicate spines. The arms lack dorsal and ventral shields; the madreporite is on edge of central disc. The digestive glands extend into proximal portions of arms. It has no bursae for gonads and gas exchange/excretion. O. fugiens demonstrates a small, triangular plated mouth, featuring a set of six conically arranged teeth. O. fugiens has been reported to be a dark brown or purple in color, sometimes exhibiting spotted coloration.

Ecology
Ophiocanops fugiens is a species- once thought to be extinct- found in South Asian seas, with studied specimens being found in the shores of the Philippines. O. fugiens can be found in waters as shallow as the seashore floor to depths of 200 meters.  O. fugiens has been found to have a mutualistic symbiotic relationship with Black Corals. O. fugiens feeds on potentially harmful microorganisms and micro-particles that inhabit coral reefs. Additionally, O. fugiens may scavenge benthic floors for detritus and plankton, or alternatively, can use the propellant motion of their arms to capture surrounding particles to feed on. The arms serve further purpose as well. O. fugiens lacks eyes, but receives and responds to changes in light via photoreceptive tissues in their appendages. There are no reports of sexual dimorphism within the species. The evolutionary development of O. fugiens has been largely classified as an enigma, and little is known regarding it. O. fugiens. It's incredibly small and compact central disc is proposed to have developed to lessen pressure of predation, as O. fugiens is capable of regenerating arms. The reproductive tendencies of O. fugiens are not well known. Highly developed gonads extend into the arms, and it is presumed that female O. fugiens carry fertilized eggs in the arms, and release them through a distinguishable genital slit, also apparent on the arms. Juvenile development is lecithotrophic, meaning the larvae feed on yolk in order to develop to metamorphosis. As larvae develops, the anus is lost, and intestines are not apparent.

References 

Oegophiurida
Animals described in 1922